The French Crit'Air air quality certificate is a vignette (a secure sticker) issued to show a vehicle's compliance with European emission standards.

Crit'Air covers all road vehicles, including motorcycles, quad bikes, private cars, vans, trucks, coaches and buses.

Under the Law on Energy Transition for Green Growth, local councils are allowed to provide benefits only to less polluting vehicles, and vignettes enable them to be identified. The system also allows urban areas to restrict the use of the more polluting vehicles, either at all times, or when pollution levels are high.

Crit'Air was developed by the French Ministry of the Environment in collaboration with the French Ministry of the Interior to reduce the environmental impact of road transport.

Drivers are required to place the vignette on the inside of the lower-right hand corner of their windscreen; different colour vignettes indicate different emissions classes.

The vignettes can be ordered online for payment of a small fee, currently €3.67 including postage, after submission of a copy of the vehicle registration certificate for verification of the emissions class. Many online third party sellers also provide a different interface to order Crit'Air vignettes for a higher price, typically €20-30.

Categories 
There six different coloured vignettes, relating to six categories. The category in which a vehicle falls depends on the engine type (electric, hydrogen, petrol or diesel) and the European emission standard (Euro standard). Where the emission standard is not recorded, the date of first registration is used instead to determine a category. The categories are not based on actual technical measurement of the vehicle in question.

Environmental zones
France has two types of zone that have emissions-related traffic restrictions. Both are enforced by the use of the Crit'Air vignettes.

ZCR

ZPA
In a zone de protection de l'air (ZPA), which tends to be significantly larger than the ZCR zones, traffic is only restricted by public announcement at times of high air pollution; and all vehicles must display a vignette at those times.

If a ZPA applies to an entire département then it is termed a ZPAd.

See also
 Low-emission zone

References

Air pollution control systems